The Antonins, known formally as the Antonin Maronite Order (abbreviated OAM), is a monastic order of pontifical right for men in the Maronite Church, which from the beginning has been specifically a monastic Church. The order was founded on August 15, 1700, in the Monastery of Mar Chaaya, Lebanon by Maronite Patriarch Gabriel of Blaouza (1704-1705).

Its name comes from the Arabic Antouniyah. They are also called Mar Chaaya monks, in reference to the monastery hosting the see of their superior general. It is one of the three Maronite congregations of monks alongside the Baladites and Aleppians.

See also
 Mar Sarkis, Ehden
 Maronite Church

Maronite Religious Institutes (Orders) 
 Baladites
 Aleppians
 Kreimists

Melkite Religious Institutes (Orders) 
Basilian Chouerite Order
Basilian Salvatorian Order
Basilian Alepian Order

References

Maronite orders and societies
Religious organizations established in 1700
Christian religious orders established in the 17th century
1700 establishments in the Ottoman Empire